The Sierra Sands Unified School District is located in the Indian Wells Valley of California. It was established in 1960. It serves all of Indian Wells Valley, including the cities of Ridgecrest, Inyokern, China Lake, Johannesburg and Kernville.  The District serves an estimated 50,000 residents. Sierra Sands has seven elementary schools, three middle schools and two high schools.

List of schools 

Courtesy of www.ssusd.org - original 
North County School later became Sherman E Burroughs High School in 1944.  It moved to a new site in 1960 where the building became Murray Middle School (now closed).  The first schools were Faller and Pierce Elementary, and Monroe Middle.

Adult School
 Sierra Vista Educational Center 
 1327 N. Norma, Rm. 143 
 Ridgecrest, CA 93555 
Burroughs High School
 500 French Ave. 
 Ridgecrest, CA 93555 
Mesquite High School
 140 Drummond Ave. 
 Ridgecrest, CA 93555 
James Monroe Middle School
 340 W Church Ave. 
 Ridgecrest, CA 93555 
Murray Middle School
 921 E Inyokern Rd. 
 Ridgecrest, CA 93555 
Faller Elementary School
 1500 Upjohn Ave. 
 Ridgecrest, CA 93555 
Gateway Elementary School (special studies)
 501 S. Gateway Blvd. 
 Ridgecrest, CA 93555 
Inyokern Elementary School
 6601 Locust Ave. 
 Inyokern, CA 
Las Flores Elementary School
 720 Las Flores Ave. 
 Ridgecrest, CA 93555 
Pierce Elementary School
 674 N. Gold Canyon St. 
 Ridgecrest, CA 93555 
Rand Elementary School
 P.O. Box 157 (Coeur d' Alene Ave. & Elmo St.) 
 Johannesburg, CA 93528-0157 
Richmond Elementary School
 1206 Kearsarge Ave. 
 Ridgecrest, CA 93555 

Closed schools: Vieweg Elementary (in mid 2010s) - replaced by Las Flores.

See also
List of school districts in California

References

External links
Sierra Sands Unified School District
Burroughs High School
List of schools

School districts in Kern County, California
Ridgecrest, California
1960 establishments in California
School districts established in 1960